Always Never the Same may refer to:

 Always Never the Same (Kansas album), 1998
 Always Never the Same (George Strait album), 1999